Wakefield Dairy Complex is a historic commercial building associated with the Royall Mill and located at Wake Forest, Wake County, North Carolina.  The complex was built in 1934, and consists of an 8,000 square foot, four-story, dairy barn with silos; a bull barn; and a calf barn.  It was built to house John Sprunt Hill's Guernsey dairy herd.

It was listed on the National Register of Historic Places in 2003.

References 

Agricultural buildings and structures on the National Register of Historic Places
Farms on the National Register of Historic Places in North Carolina
Buildings and structures completed in 1934
Buildings and structures in Wake County, North Carolina
National Register of Historic Places in Wake County, North Carolina
Agricultural buildings and structures on the National Register of Historic Places in North Carolina
1934 establishments in North Carolina